Caribintair was an airline that flew domestic and international routes from Port-au-Prince, Haiti. It was established in 1989. Operations stopped in April 2009.

It operated scheduled flights to Cap-Haïtien, Les Cayes, Jérémie, Santo Domingo, Santiago, Providenciales and Nassau

Fleet
2 BAe Jetstream 31
2 Let L-410 Turbolet
3 Cessna 208

Codeshare agreements
Caribair was the parent company of Caribintair. Caribair had six aircraft on lease for this airline.  Caribair operated domestic flights in Haiti, as well as some international flights to Santo Domingo and Santiago, Dominican Republic. It also operated charter flights into Barahona and Dajabon.
All Caribintair flights Were codeshared by Caribair.

References

Aviation Safety Network, Caribintair

Defunct airlines of Haiti
Airlines established in 1989
Airlines disestablished in 2009
Companies based in Port-au-Prince
1989 establishments in North America
2009 disestablishments in North America